Parang is a form of folk music in Venezuela and Trinidad and Tobago.

Parang may also refer to:
 Parang (batik), an Indonesian batik motif
 Parang (knife), a type of machete from Indonesia
 locations in the Philippines:
Parang, Jose Panganiban
Parang, Maguindanao, a municipality in the province of Maguindanao, Philippines.
Parang, in Marikina
Parang, Sulu
 Parâng Mountains group, in the Southern Carpathians, Romania

See also

Farang
Barang (disambiguation)